This is a list of seasons completed by the Creighton Bluejays men's college basketball team.  The Bluejays have won 20 regular season crowns and 12 conference tournament titles.  They have appeared in 18 NCAA basketball tournaments, reaching the Sweet Sixteen 4 times.

Season-by-Season Results

References

Creighton Bluejays

Creighton Bluejays basketball seasons